Francisco Romão de Oliveira e Silva (October 1, 1942 – July 25, 2004) was an Angolan politician who served as the deputy foreign minister.  He played an important part in Angola's war of independence against Portugal.

He was the Governor of Luanda Province from 1980 to 1981, ambassador to Yugoslavia from 1981 to 1987 and ambassador to Brazil from 1987 to 1993.

He died in an apparent suicide by leaping from the eighth story of the Hotel Presidente in the capital city, Luanda.

References

1942 births
2004 suicides
Politicians who committed suicide
Suicides by jumping in Angola
Angolan diplomats
Suicides in Angola
MPLA politicians
Ambassadors of Angola to Yugoslavia
Ambassadors of Angola to Brazil
Governors of Luanda
2004 deaths